"The Leprechaun-Artist" (also broadcast as "Three Irish Wishes") is the first segment of the nineteenth episode from the first season (1985–86) of the television series The Twilight Zone. It is a story in the tradition of "The Monkey's Paw", with three boys gaining three magical wishes which prove to have unintended negative consequences.

Plot
A vacationing leprechaun is captured by three boys named Buddy, JP, and Richie, who take him to their clubhouse. The leprechaun tells them they may have one wish each. Buddy makes a wish for X-ray vision so that he can see beneath girls' clothing. The next morning, Buddy finds it hard to control the intensity of his powers. He sees internal organs and skulls instead of just underneath their clothing, and the power gives him crippling headaches. The leprechaun reverses the wish without charge.

JP wishes that their parents all do whatever they tell them to. As a result, their parents become so docile and mindless that JP has to give his mother step-by-step directions to get her to cook a frozen pizza. The boys accuse the leprechaun of tricking them, forcing them to use their final wish to undo the second one. As a show of good faith, the leprechaun also reverses the second wish without charge.

Richie wishes for a fast, "really hot" car, unlimited gasoline, and a driver with a mind of his own. Having fulfilled his obligation, the leprechaun disappears. They find a limo and driver waiting. At the boys' orders, the driver goes well over the speed limit. The police pursue them for speeding, and the boys tell the driver to pull over. However, the driver shows that he has "a mind of his own" and tries to outrace the police. The limo is forced to stop by road construction and a vehicle coming the other direction. The driver flees, leaving the boys to take the heat.

The boys are held for auto theft, and realize that the word "hot" in Richie's wish was interpreted to mean stolen. The leprechaun appears and, saying that he likes the look of the boys, reverses the third wish. The police now have no knowledge of their crime. The boys gladly go home.

External links
 
 Postcards from the Zone episode 1.47 The Leprechaun-Artist

1986 American television episodes
The Twilight Zone (1985 TV series season 1) episodes
Leprechauns in popular culture

fr:Les Trois Vœux